Once in a Lifetime is a live album from German futurepop band Blutengel. It was recorded in Berlin released as a 2xCD album, DVD and Blu-ray. It is the first Blutengel release on Blu-ray format. Three of the songs performed were symphonic versions, Die With You & Ein Augenblick were both originally performed at 2012 Gothic Meets Klassik festival, and No Eternity was later performed along with a selection of songs from Monument for a classical tour. All three of these symphonic versions were omitted from their 2014 symphonic album Black Symphonies (An Orchestral Journey) and exist only on this album.

Track listing

References

External links
Discogs entry
Musicfolio

2013 live albums
Blutengel albums